The imperial election of 19 October 1314 was an imperial election held to select the emperor of the Holy Roman Empire.  It took place in Sachsenhausen, near Frankfurt.

The election was called by Heinrich II, Count of Virneburg, at the time Archbishop of Cologne and former member of the pro-Luxembourg party, to decide the successor of Emperor Henry VII, died while in Italy on 24 August 1313. Henry's son John, King of Bohemia since 1310, was considered by many prince-electors to be too young, and by others to be already too powerful. Many nobles preferred instead Frederick the Fair, Duke of Austria and Styria and son of Henry VII's predecessor Albert I. Of seven electors, only four attended the meeting, one of whom was disputed:
 Henrich II, Archbishop-Elector of Cologne
 Rudolf I, Elector Palatine
 Rudolf I, Duke of Saxe-Wittenberg, Elector of Saxony
 Henry, Duke of Carinthia, deposed King-Elector of Bohemia, who still claimed the title

As a result of the election, Frederick the Fair was elected Holy Roman Emperor. However, due to the unrecognized claim of Henry of Carinthia, the election was considered invalid by the other electors, that the day after elected Louis IV, Duke of Bavaria as Holy Roman Emperor.

References

1314
1314 in the Holy Roman Empire
14th-century elections
Non-partisan elections